Ramsay Ames (born Ramsay Phillips, March 30, 1919 – March 30, 1998) was a leading 1940s American B movie actress, model, dancer, pin-up girl and television host. As a dancer, she was billed as Ramsay D'el Rico. She appeared in the film The Mummy's Ghost (1944), where she played Princess Ananka.

Career
Of Spanish/English descent, Ames was born on Long Island. Athletic in high school, she excelled as a swimmer. Ames first was recognized as a dancer/singer before moving into sultry-eyed 1940s film roles.

Ames had attended the Walter Hillhouse School of Dance, specializing in Latin-style dance. She later became part of a dance team under the name Ramsay D'el Rico and appeared as a model at the Eastman Kodak-sponsored fashion show at the 1939 New York World's Fair. An injury forced her to alter her dance career plans. She took up singing and became the vocalist with a top rhumba band.

During a trip to California to visit her mother, Ramsay had a chance meeting at the airport with Columbia Pictures President Harry Cohn. The meeting resulted in a screen test and then her movie debut in Two Señoritas from Chicago (1943).

From there, she moved to Universal Pictures, where she was featured in such films as Calling Dr. Death and Ali Baba and the Forty Thieves. She later appeared in a Monogram Pictures drama, Below the Deadline (1946), and in Republic serials including The Black Widow (1947) and G-Men Never Forget (1948).

After her career subsided in the 1940s, Ames and her husband lived in Spain, where she had her own television interview show and occasionally took on support roles in films produced in Europe.

She was wed to "Man of La Mancha" playwright Dale Wasserman, and the couple later lived in a villa called "La Mancha" on the Costa del Sol.

According to director William Witney, some of Republic Pictures' stuntmen suffered more injuries running on rooftops to get a better look at Ramsay Ames walking across the backlot than were hurt performing dangerous action sequences in the studio's westerns.

Personal life
She was married to and later divorced Dale Wasserman, a Tony Award-winning musical writer. She died of lung cancer in 1998 on her 79th birthday.

Selected filmography

 Two Señoritas from Chicago (1943) as Louise Hotchkiss
 Crazy House (1943) as Herself (as Ramsay Ames and Her Tropicanans)
 Calling Dr. Death (1943) as Maria Steele
 Ali Baba and the Forty Thieves (1944) as Nalu
 Ladies Courageous (1944) (uncredited)
 Hat Check Honey (1944) as Mona Mallory
 Follow the Boys (1944) as Laura
 Ghost Catchers (1944) as Minor Role (uncredited)
 The Mummy's Ghost (1944) as Amina Mansouri
 A Wave, a WAC and a Marine (1944) as Betty
 Mildred Pierce (1945) as Party Guest (uncredited)
 Too Young to Know (1945) as Party Guest #1
 The Gay Cavalier (1946) as Pepita Geralda
 Below the Deadline (1946) as Lynn Turner
 Beauty and the Bandit (1946) as Jeanne Du Bois
 The Time, the Place and the Girl (1946) as Bar Patron (uncredited)
 Philo Vance Returns (1947) as Virginia Berneaux
 The Vigilante: Fighting Hero of the West (1947) as Betty Winslow
 Green Dolphin Street (1947) as Corinne (uncredited)
 The Black Widow (1947) as Ruth Dayton
 G-Men Never Forget (1948, Serial) as Frances Blake
 Vicki (1953) as Café Photographer (uncredited)
 The Lie (1954, TV Movie) as Marlene
 Alexander the Great (1956) as Drunken Woman (as Ramsey Ames)
 At Five O'Clock in the Afternoon (1961) as Americana (uncredited) 
 The Running Man (1963) as Madge Penderby
 Una tal Dulcinea (1963) (final film role)

Soundtrack (5 credits) 
 Two Señoritas from Chicago (1943) (performer: "Coca Chica")
 Crazy House (1943) (performer: "Tropicana" - uncredited)
 Hat Check Honey (1944) (performer: "Nice To Know You")
 The Gay Cavalier (performer: "One Kiss and Ride", "The Gay Caballero") (1946) (writer: "One Kiss and Ride", "The Gay Caballero")
 Philo Vance Returns (1947) (performer: "Tell Me")

Archive footage (5 credits) 
 The Mummy's Ghost (Short) (1966) Amina
 Sombra, the Spider Woman (TV Movie) (1966) Ruth Dayton
 Code 645 (TV Movie) (1966) (Frances Blake)
 Mummy Dearest: A Horror Tradition Unearthed (Video documentary short) (1999) Amina Mansouri
 Svengoolie (TV Series)- The Mummy's Ghost (2012) (2012)

Pictorial
Yank (USA)24 December 1943
Yank (USA)20 April 1945
Yank (USA)4 May 1945

References

 Screen Sirens Scream (USA)2000, pg. 3-11, by: Paul Parla/Charles P. Mitchell "Reminiscences Of The Doomed Ananka"
 Filmfax (USA)July 1998, Iss. 67, pg. 46-49, by: Paul Parla/Charles P. Mitchell, "Bride Of The Mummy"
 Fantastyka (France)July 1998, Iss. 16, pg. 36-38, by: Paul Parla/Charles P. Mitchell, "Souvenirs D'Ananka La Mandite"
 Movie Collectors World (USA)28 November 1997, Iss. 539, pg. 86-88, by: Paul Parla/Charles P. Mitchell, "Reminiscences Of The Doomed Ananka"
 Scary Monsters Magazine (USA)June 1997, Iss. 23, pg. 47-50, by: Paul Parla, "I Shall Make You Immortal"
 Classic Images (USA)June 1996, Iss. 252, pg. 28-29, by: Paul Parla, "Ramsay Ames-Sultry Latin Beauty"

External links

 
 Answers.com biography

1919 births
1998 deaths
Actresses from New York City
Deaths from lung cancer in California
Burials at Holy Cross Cemetery, Culver City
American film actresses
20th-century American actresses
People from Brooklyn